Cora cyphellifera is a species of basidiolichen in the family Hygrophoraceae. Found in northern Ecuador, it was formally described as a new species in 2013 by Manuela Dal-Forno, Frank Bungartz, and Robert Lücking. Cora cyphellifera is only known to occur at the type locality, which is a montane rainforest. The specific epithet refers to the unusual cyphelloid structure (i.e., with concavities or pits in the surface) of the thallus; this characteristic is otherwise unknown in the genus Cora. According to the authors, "it almost looks like the lichenized thallus is parasitized by a non-lichenized, cyphelloid mushroom".

References

cyphellifera
Lichen species
Lichens described in 2013
Lichens of Ecuador
Taxa named by Robert Lücking
Basidiolichens